Freddy Homburger (8 February 1916 in Sankt Gallen, Switzerland- 25 September 2001 in Cambridge, Massachusetts) was a Swiss-born oncologist. In 1973, Homburger was studying the cause of cancer and its relation with cigarette smoking. He succeeded in inducing laryngeal cancer in hamsters who smoked; however, the Council for Tobacco Research, which was underwriting his research, forbid him to publish his research results as long as he referred to the growths as "cancerous", and threatened to ruin him financially.

Homburger, and his suppressed research, gained prominence in 1997 in tobacco-related lawsuits.

External links
Transcript of 1997 deposition of Freddy Homburger at TobaccoDocuments.org

1916 births
2001 deaths
Swiss oncologists
20th-century Swiss physicians
Swiss emigrants to the United States